Kahiwi Maihao Ridge is a rocky ridge in Antarctica. The ridge was named in the Māori language by the New Zealand Geographic Board in 1994.

References

Ridges of Victoria Land
Scott Coast